The Real Girl's Kitchen is an American cooking television series that aired on Cooking Channel. The series was presented by actress Haylie Duff; and it featured Duff showcasing recipes inspired by her travels to New York City, as well as her hometown of Los Angeles.

The Real Girl's Kitchen premiered on August 9, 2014 and concluded on July 25, 2015, after two seasons.

Episodes

Season 1 (2014)

Season 2 (2015)

Awards and nominations

References

External links
 
 

2010s American cooking television series
2014 American television series debuts
2015 American television series endings
Cooking Channel original programming
English-language television shows
Food reality television series
Television series by Ora TV
Television shows filmed in Los Angeles